Christopher Gerard O'Malley (born 9 June 1959) is a former Irish Fine Gael politician who served as a Member of the European Parliament (MEP) for the Dublin constituency from 1986 to 1989.

In January 1986, he was nominated to the European Parliament by Fine Gael as an MEP following the resignation of Richie Ryan. He lost his seat at the 1989 European election. In 2003, he was co-opted to Dún Laoghaire–Rathdown County Council to replace Eamon Gilmore. He lost his seat at the 2004 local elections.

In November 2007, he was appointed Pro Vice-Chancellor (Regional and International Development) at the University of Wales, Newport.

He is the grandson of Kevin O'Higgins, the government minister assassinated in 1927. He is married to former Labour Party Senator Aideen Hayden.

See also
Families in the Oireachtas

References

External links

1959 births
Living people
Labour Party (Ireland) politicians
Local councillors in Dún Laoghaire–Rathdown
Fine Gael MEPs
MEPs for the Republic of Ireland 1984–1989
People associated with the University of Wales, Newport
People educated at Belvedere College